These are the international rankings of Tanzania.

International rankings

References

Tanzania